Anna Kolářová (born 17 April 1997) is a Czech swimmer. She competed in the women's 200 metre freestyle event at the 2017 World Aquatics Championships.

References

1997 births
Living people
Czech female swimmers
Place of birth missing (living people)
Czech female freestyle swimmers